Below is a list of governors of Aceh, one of the provinces of Indonesia, from Indonesian independence to the present day.

List of governors
 = Acting governor, in place until a full governor was formerly appointed

Note

References

Aceh
Politics of Aceh
History of Aceh